Lee Tae-ran (born 25 March 1975) is a South Korean actress. She is best known for her roles in Korean dramas such as Yellow Handkerchief, My Rosy Life, Famous Princesses, Wang's Family, and Sky Castle.

Early life and education 
Lee Tae-ran was born in Seoul on 25 March 1975. She is the second of two daughters. Lee moved to Seoul as a child. After graduating from Haeseong International Convention High School, she worked in a company for three years and supported herself with part-time jobs at a cafe in Myeong-dong or a Japanese restaurant in Daehangno. Lee once expressed her sadness at being a mere high school graduate in a television show.  In 2008, she enrolled as a theatre and film student in the College of Art in Hanyang University.

Career

1997–2004
Lee was discovered by an agent while doing part-time jobs. She had a small role in the SBS drama The Brothers' River, marking her TV debut. Lee next entered the 1997 SBS Top Talent Competition after a friend's suggestion and won the Grand Prize. She has since appeared in many television dramas in the late 1990s, such as Fascinate My Heart, Goodbye My Love, Days of Delight and Soonpoong Clinic. For her performance in Fascinate My Heart and Days of Delight, she was honoured with 1998 SBS New Star Award and 1999 MBC New Star Award respectively.

By the early 2000s, Lee's career was gaining momentum. In 2002, she received KBS Excellence in Acting Award for her portrayal of the bubbly model Lee Ha-na in the romantic comedy Who's My Love. The following year, she landed a lead role in the well-received drama Yellow Handkerchief, co-starring Jo Min-ki. Lee received her first KBS Top Excellence in Acting Award for her portrayal of Yoon Ja-young, a designer who was dumped by her boyfriend of ten years and raised a child alone.

2005–2012
In 2005, she appeared in the highly popular KBS series My Rosy Life,  written by Moon Young-nam, which also featured Choi Jin-sil. She earned the KBS Popularity Award for her character of Maeng Young-yi, a successful career woman who didn't believe in love. After the success of My Rosy Life, she played the lead in the KBS drama Famous Princesses, also written by Moon.  The drama recorded high audience rating and garnered several award nominations and wins for its actors.  Lee's portrayal of Daewi Na Seol-chil has been widely acclaimed, earning her second KBS Top Excellence in Acting Award and Best Couple Award with Park Hae-jin in 2006.

Lee next starred in lead role of Jang In-ho in KBS’s My Precious You alongside Kim Sung-soo in 2008.  In 2010, she appeared in KBS’s war drama Legend of the Patriots, opposite Choi Soo-jong, in commemoration of the 60th anniversary of the Korean War.  In 2012, Lee starred in JTBC’s drama How Long I've Kissed, alongside Lee Sung-jae.

2013–present
In 2013, Lee returned to SBS in the drama Goddess of Marriage, after a three-year hiatus from major Korean TV networks. She also played the role of Wang Ho-bak in the KBS weekend drama Wang's Family, which was her third work written by Moon Young-nam.

In 2018, she starred in the hit drama Sky Castle as Lee Soo-im, a novel writer and the humble and loving housewife and stepmother in the Hwang household.

China
In conjunction with her success at home, Lee has become one of the most recognised Korean actresses in China.  In 2001, she had a supporting role in CCTV’s drama Modern Family, playing a Korean daughter-in-law who married into a Chinese family. Her works Yellow Handkerchief and My Rosy Life were shown on CCTV-8.  In 2009, Famous Princesses was shown on Hunan Television. It became a huge hit nationwide and was voted “Overseas TV Drama of the Year”.  In 2010, Lee landed a lead role in the Chinese TV drama The Lure of Cloud.  In 2011, she appeared in the Chinese historical drama Di Jin with Korean actor Kangta.  In 2012, she had a lead role in another historical drama For the Sake of Beauty with Hong Kong actor Patrick Tam. In 2013, Lee filmed a drama The Way We Were, produced by Huayi Brothers, a big-shot Chinese entertainment agency.

Films
In 1997, Lee made her film debut in Story of A Man, opposite Choi Min-soo as the film's title character. In 2007, she starred in Love Exposure, the Korean version of Sex and the City, alongside Lee Mi-yeon. In 2012, she appeared alongside Cha In-pyo in the film My Boy, on a pro bono basis and was also involved in the production. The film made its world premiere at the 18th Busan International Film Festival in October 2013, and hit Korean theatres on 10 April 2014.

Personal life 
On 17 February 2014, it was announced that Lee was going to marry businessman Shin Seung-hwan. The couple wed in a private Christian ceremony at Villa de Bailey in Seoul on 1 March 2014.

Philanthropy
In May 2008, Lee travelled to Nepal with the ‘’Seollebal Mountain Club’’ to carry out volunteer work. She joined singer Lee Moon-sae, actor Park Sang-won and film director Han Ji-seung to help reconstruct a school. Lee's self-portrait, based on a photo taken in Nepal, was made public for the first time in Korea Art Summer Festival 2009. She hoped that proceeds from the sale of her painting would go to charity. In March 2009, alongside Hanyang University celebrity alumni Jang Keun-suk, Ha Seok-jin, Park Mi-sun and Jung Il-woo, Lee participated in the Blood Donation Festival “Seventy Days of Miracles”, an effort to raise money for children with heart disease and other people in dire need.  On 8 July 2011, Lee attended charity-sponsored fashion show and bazaar “Wello! Africa’’, with Sistar and Jo Dong-hyuk, to promote education in Africa. The event was hosted by World Vision.  In October 2012, Lee travelled to Tanzania for the filming of MBC’s reality show “2012 KOICA’s Dream”, alongside Nichkhun, Taecyeon, Park Sung-woong, Kim Hyuk and other volunteers. It's a show where celebrities do community service work in underprivileged countries.

Lee was named an ambassador at the Mapo Happiness Sharing Food Market in 2009. She volunteers at the food market, donates rice, and also visits elderly citizens living alone, people with disabilities, and low-income families at least twice a month. Her service was recognised by the Ministry of Health and Welfare at the 4th Food Bank National Food Sharing Convention in 2010 and the 7th Food Bank National Food Sharing Convention in 2013. On 6 December 2013, she donated 2.76 tonnes of fan rice to the Mapo Happiness Sharing Food Market.

Lee arrived in Uganda in April 2014, just one month after her wedding. She travelled to remote villages where many people are suffering from elephantiasis and found it "heartbreaking". Her week-long mission was featured in "2014 SBS Hope TV", a show designed to raise awareness about the issues that Africans face, and bringing in donations at the same time.

On February 15, 2023, Lee donated 10 million won to help 2023 Turkey–Syria earthquake, by donating money through Warm Day.

Filmography

Television

Film

Variety show series

Theatre

Other work

Music

Photo album

References

External links
  	
  
 
 
 
 

1975 births
Living people
South Korean film actresses
South Korean stage actresses
South Korean television actresses
Hanyang University alumni